Perkiomen Valley Airport  is formerly a privately owned, public use airport located two nautical miles (4 km) northeast of the central business district of Collegeville, a borough in Montgomery County, Pennsylvania, United States. The airport was built by Wells MacCormack and opened on March 1, 1938. It closed in March of 2021. It was included in the National Plan of Integrated Airport Systems for 2009–2013, which categorized it as a general aviation facility.

Facilities and aircraft 
Perkiomen Valley Airport covers an area of 60 acres (24 ha) at an elevation of 277 feet (84 m) above mean sea level. It has one runway designated 9/27 with an asphalt surface measuring 2,880 by 40 feet (878 x 12 m).

Valley Forge Aviation is a fixed-base operator (FBO) located on the field.

For the 12-month period ending March 15, 2012, the airport had 10,520 aircraft operations, an average of 28 per day: 99.8% general aviation and 0.2% military. At that time there were 22 aircraft based at this airport: 91% single-engine and 9% multi-engine.

References

External links 
 Perkiomen Valley Airport
 Perkiomen Valley Airport (N10) at PennDOT Bureau of Aviation
 Aerial photo as of April 1999 from USGS The National Map via MSR Maps
 

Airports in Pennsylvania
Transportation buildings and structures in Montgomery County, Pennsylvania